James Andrew Reed , FCIPD (born April 1963) is a British businessman. He is chairman and chief executive of the Reed group of companies. He is the son of Sir Alec Reed, who founded the company in 1960. He is chairman of The Big Give Trust, a match-funding charity supported in part by the Reed Foundation and the Reed family. The Big Give has raised over £233 million for UK-registered charities and aims to raise £1 billion by 2030.

Education
Reed attended Scaitcliffe prep school and St Paul's. He graduated from Christ Church, Oxford in 1984 with a degree in Philosophy, Politics and Economics (PPE) and subsequently gained an MBA from Harvard Business School. At Oxford, Reed was political editor of Samizdat, a magazine for political science students. At Harvard he produced In The Shadow of The City, a case study and video about slum improvement works in Addis Ababa, Ethiopia.

Early career
Reed's first job was levelling graves at a graveyard in Old Windsor, which he described as "...miserable, it was cold, it was horrible and hard - and I didn't last very long at it."

He graduated from Oxford in 1984, seeking to work for an entrepreneur. He sent a speculative job application to Gordon and Anita Roddick of The Body Shop, working in the firm's stores in Brighton and Great Marlborough Street, London. The Roddicks then hired him as Gordon's assistant. Reed then worked for Saatchi & Saatchi between 1985–1986, where he managed advertising campaigns for British Rail, Club 18-30, Eurotunnel and Procter and Gamble. 

From 1987 to 1988 he coordinated relief and development programmes in Bangladesh, Pakistan and Soviet-occupied Afghanistan, on behalf of Help the Aged and Afghanaid. He coordinated fundraising, publicity, and sponsorship for Afghanaid and covered the Afghan conflict for The Independent newspaper. He entered Afghanistan disguised as an Afghan travelling with Mujahideen rebels.

Reed joined the BBC in 1990, after graduating from Harvard. He produced documentaries for BBC TV on topics such as Tom Peters and prison privatisation. After the Tom Peters documentary grossed £1m, Reed requested funding for a similar programme but was denied, prompting him to leave the BBC.

He became a non-executive director of Reed in 1992. In a 2014 radio interview, he spoke of the background to joining the family business full-time: "Joining the family business wasn't a fait accompli. When my father got to 60 he said, 'James, there's not much point having a family business if there isn't any family in it'. I'd been sitting on the fence for some time. Then one day he said, ‘That job that I have been talking to you about? It’s going to be in The Sunday Times Appointments section next week – do you want to apply or not?'."Reed frequently acknowledges that his appointment to the family business was based partly  on nepotism, telling The Guardian in 2010 that "...there is no other way to describe it.” Reed's father is quoted as believing that family-run businesses "...cut out a lot of company politics".

Reed Group
Reed became operations director at Reed Group in April 1994 and chief executive in 1997;  Reed's father gave him a baton to symbolise the handover of power. The baton now hangs on the wall of Reed's personal office. He succeeded his father to the position of Chairman in 2004.

Reed has said that his three most significant contributions to the Reed Group are the development of reed.co.uk, the introduction of Reed in Partnership and the globalisation of the company. The company's revenue has increased from £150 million to £1.2 billion under his leadership.

Welfare-to-work (Reed in Partnership)
In 1997 Reed was invited to bid on contracts issued by the Blair administration, in which some of the traditional work of Job Centres was outsourced to the private sector. This resulted in Reed in Partnership, which now employs 1800 people.

De-listing
As chief executive, Reed delisted Reed Executive from the UK Stock Exchange in 2003, buying back the company for 140p per share and a valuation of £62.6m. Some financial commentators claimed the Reed family took advantage of a lull in the firm's share price following a cyclical slump and the controversy around the spin-off of Reed Health. Reed launched a hostile takeover of Reed Health two years later, bringing the company back under the family's control. According to Reed, the firm was delisted because it no longer required outside capital; Reed's father suggested in his autobiography that the de-listing was caused in part by the publication of the Higgs and Cadbury reports, which called for greater restrictions on public company governance.

Reed.co.uk
reed.co.uk was the first recruitment website offered by a recruitment agency in the UK. It launched in 1995 with 40 vacancies. It now hosts over 3.3 million jobs per year. The company's first website was suggested and built by a young IT contractor nicknamed "Pancake the Clown", after the contractor's sideline business as a children's entertainer. Reed later said: "The truth of the matter is, I got Pancake the Clown to build our first prototype."

Reed has also spoken of being "horrified" when a young member of staff suggested that the website should offer vacancies advertised by rival recruitment firms. Reed would go on to approve the experiment; the scheme began in May 2000 and by November of the same year over 2000 rival firms had registered on the site. Reed would go on to credit the idea as being the foundation of the firm's online strategy. The junior employee earned a £100,000 bonus for his suggestion.

Media commentary
Reed is a frequent media commentator on employment issues, including wages, apprenticeships, automation, working in retirement, employee engagement and prisoner/ex-prisoner employment. He has also commented on tax reform for family businesses. He has argued that state contracts should be withheld from corporations that purposely delay creditor payments, branding such firms as "drunk-drivers". He has also encouraged school-leavers to consider work instead of further study.

Reed predicted a 'tsunami of employment losses' in 2020 COVID-19, but afterwards became bullish on the UK economy. In 2022, he expected that a shift in power toward employees and hybrid working would endure "...for this business cycle at least." He supports remote work. 

Reed is a fellow of the Chartered Institute of Personnel and Development (CIPD). He was formerly an associate of the Prime Minister's Delivery Unit and a member of the IPPR's Taskforce on Race Equality and Diversity in the Private Sector.

Television appearances
Between 2008 and 2018, Reed appeared in a series of TV commercials starring the actor and comedian Rufus Jones. Jones plays Reed as a caricature of a superhero who transforms job seekers into their ideal role. In one advert Reed makes a cameo appearance as an ice-cream seller who is then transformed into a nightclub DJ. The adverts have received more than 28 million YouTube views. Some adverts have been directed by the previous year's winners of Reed's annual Short Film Competition. 

Reed has appeared in Series 11, 13 and 15 of BBC TV's The Apprentice.

Philanthropy

Reed is a trustee of several Reed family charitable initiatives, including the Reed Foundation and The Big Give Trust. The Big Give is sponsored and supported by the Reed Foundation, which was gifted an 18% stake in Reed Group by the Reed family, leading The Guardian newspaper to write that Reed employees "...effectively work one day a week to fund good causes".  

The Big Give Trust is chaired by Reed and has helped to raise over £233m for UK-registered charities. It was founded by Reed's father, Sir Alec Reed, in 2007.   

During the COVID-19 pandemic, Reed re-launched the Keep Britain Working campaign following its initial launch in the wake of the 2008 financial crisis.  Alongside Lord Sugar, Lord Bamford, Luke Johnson, James Timpson and others, Reed called upon CEOs to protect jobs by sacrificing management salaries and company profit. During the campaign Reed declined his salary from the family business. He also donated £100,000 from personal funds to the National Emergencies Trust (NET), which was matched by a £100,000 donation from the Reed Foundation via The Big Give, whose campaign for NET raised £1.36m in total.

Following the 2022 Russian invasion of Ukraine, The Big Give raised over £3.67m for the Disasters Emergency Committee Ukraine Humanitarian Appeal. In the same year, The Big Give raised £1.8m for women & girls charities.

In January 2022 Reed signed the Armed Forces Covenant on behalf of Reed Recruitment, in support of current and former service personnel in their transition away from the military.

In a 2023 interview with The Times, Reed called on the UK’s wealthiest 1% to give more to charitable causes, stating: “There needs to be a call to arms for the wealthy…the first place to look is in the mirror, isn’t it?"

Grenfell Tower appeal
Reed's family home in London is within sight of Grenfell Tower. After witnessing the Grenfell Tower fire, Reed set up a Big Give charity appeal that raised £1m within 48 hours of the disaster. The appeal went on to raise £2.6m. Reed donated £100,000 of his own money and the Reed Foundation donated a further £100,000, alongside donations made by members of the public, businesses and local organisations. The proceeds were donated to The K&C Foundation. Reed called for some of the appeal proceeds to be spent on an educational centre for local residents to learn coding and other digital skills.

Publications

Put Your Mindset to Work
Co-authored by Reed and Harvard lecturer Paul G. Stoltz, Put Your Mindset to Work was published by Portfolio Penguin in May 2011. The book highlights the importance of an employee's mindset, observing that 97% of employers value mindset over skill. The book identifies three elements of a desirable mindset, namely Global, Good and Grit. A Global executive sets their actions and decisions in a global context; a Good executive is sensitive to others and seeks to do good; an executive with Grit is tenacious in the workplace.

The title entered the USA Today best-seller list in June 2011. It won a CMI Management Book of the Year Award, in the Commuters' Read category. A second edition was published in August 2013, with endorsements from Timpson CEO James Timpson, Gordon Roddick and management author Jim Kouzes.

Why You: 101 Interview Questions You'll Never Fear Again
Reed's second book with Penguin Portfolio is based on input from his network of hirers, recruiters and interviewees. Reed argues all interview questions are variations on 15 themes, referred to as "The Fateful Fifteen". He goes on to caution against relying on scripted answers alone, citing the interviewer's desire for a spontaneous and authentic conversation. The book was awarded a "Highly Recommended" by Bookbag.co.uk; the Notting Hill Post described it as "...essential reading".

The 7-Second CV: How to Land the Interview 
The title refers to the critically brief amount of time that recruiters spend reading a CV. Reed offers advice on presenting an immediately-impactful CV, honing a unique selling point and the role of social media profiles. The book was endorsed by Lord Sugar.

The Happy Recruiter
In June 2019 Reed published The Happy Recruiter, a short book offering career advice for professional recruiters.

Life’s Work: 12 Proven Ways to Fast-Track Your Career
Published in January 2020, Life's Work is aimed at those about to choose or switch career. Reed argues that successful careers are built on ambition, positivity, self-knowledge and self-discipline. Successful executives tend to be sociable and gregarious - but also “sustainably selfish”, establishing personal boundaries to protect against burnout. Reed also emphasises the importance of working in high-growth sectors, where personal progress is propelled by structural change  - a phenomenon Reed likens to Poohsticks.

In a 2020 interview with Management Today, Reed described Dale Carnegie's How To Win Friends And Influence People as the business book that "...resonated most with me".

Personal life

Reed is married to the artist, beekeeper and whisky entrepreneur Nicola Arkell Reed. The couple live in London and Wiltshire and have six children.  His hobbies include running, riding and driving horses, football and mountaineering. Reed rides a Vespa to work. He has participated in two of Reed's annual Alpine Leadership Challenges, led by the alpinist Stefan Gatt. 

Reed has identified his father as the person he most admires in the recruitment industry, and King Alfred the Great as his boyhood hero.

Honours and awards
In 2019 Reed was voted top recruitment CEO on Glassdoor's Employees' Choice awards, and 20th CEO across all industries. In the same year he was named in the Europe Staffing 100 list of recruitment professionals, published by Staffing Industry Analysis. In 2020 CEO Today magazine named Reed in its list of notable CEOs. In 2021 the TIARA Recruitment Awards added Reed to the Saffery Champness Hall of Fame, for his contribution to the recruitment industry.

Reed was appointed Commander of the Order of the British Empire (CBE) in the 2023 New Year Honours for services to business and charity. He is a Fellow of the Chartered Institute of Personnel and Development (FCIPD).

References

External links
Reed.co.uk
Reed.com
Nicola Arkell Reed
KeepBritainWorking

1963 births
20th-century British businesspeople
Alumni of Christ Church, Oxford
British business writers
British business executives
British business people in recruitment
British charity and campaign group workers
British chief executives
British philanthropists
Charity fundraisers (people)
Fellows of the Chartered Institute of Personnel and Development
Commanders of the Order of the British Empire
Harvard Business School alumni
Human resource management people
Living people
People educated at Scaitcliffe School
People educated at St Paul's School, London
People from Woking